Mike Gutelius is an American football coach.  He is the 30th head football coach of the Catholic University of America football team.  He is a 1992 graduate of the Washington, D.C. university; where he earned a degree with a major in politics and a minor in philosophy.  His 2001 master's degree from the  University of La Verne was in education with a special emphasis in athletic-educational issues.

While serving as defensive coordinator at Lindsey Wilson College, the team made three-straight NAIA Football National Championship playoff appearances and were ranked number one in the nation.  Gutelius was the 2015 American Football Coaches Association NAIA Assistant of the Year.  While at Lindsey Wilson, Gutelius coached 20 all-conference defensive selections.  He has also coached at Concord University, Wingate University, the University of La Verne, St. Norbert College, and for a year immediately after graduation at Catholic University.

With his wife Kimberly, Gutelius has three children, Michael, Sam and Mary Katherine.

Head coaching record

References

External links
 Catholic University profile

Year of birth missing (living people)
Living people
Catholic University Cardinals football coaches
Concord Mountain Lions football coaches
La Verne Leopards football coaches
Lindsey Wilson Blue Raiders football coaches
St. Norbert Green Knights football coaches
Wingate Bulldogs football coaches
Catholic University of America alumni
University of La Verne alumni